The 2015 Big South Conference baseball tournament will be held from May 19 through 23.  The top eight regular season finishers of the conference's twelve teams will meet in the double-elimination tournament to be held at  John Henry Moss Stadium on the campus of Gardner–Webb University in Boiling Springs, North Carolina.  The tournament champion will earn the conference's automatic bid to the 2015 NCAA Division I baseball tournament.

Seeding and format
The top eight finishers of the league's eleven teams qualify for the double-elimination tournament. Teams are seeded based on conference winning percentage, with the first tiebreaker being head-to-head record.

Bracket

References

Tournament
Big South Conference Baseball Tournament
Big South Conference baseball tournament
Big South Conference baseball tournament